Maesiella maesae is a species of sea snail, a marine gastropod mollusk in the family Pseudomelatomidae, the turrids and allies.

The generic name Maesiella as well as the specific name maesae are named in honor of American malacologist Virginia Orr Maes.

Description
The length of the shell attains 6 mm.

Distribution
This species occurs in the Pacific Ocean off Mexico to Panama

References

External links
 McLean, J.H. (1971) A revised classification of the family Turridae, with the proposal of new subfamilies, genera, and subgenera from the Eastern Pacific. The Veliger, 14, 114–130
 
 Gastropods.com: Maesiella maesae

maesae
Gastropods described in 1971